The Wilson–Winslow House is a historic house in Coventry, Rhode Island.  The main block of this -story wood-frame house was built c. 1812, either by Joseph Wilson or his son Israel.  The house is a high-quality example of vernacular rural Federal architecture, which was altered in the 1930s as a country retreat for the Winslows, a Providence family.

The house was listed on the National Register of Historic Places in 1993.

See also
National Register of Historic Places listings in Kent County, Rhode Island

References

Houses completed in 1812
Houses on the National Register of Historic Places in Rhode Island
Houses in Kent County, Rhode Island
Buildings and structures in Coventry, Rhode Island
National Register of Historic Places in Kent County, Rhode Island